This is a list of video game soundtracks on music streaming platforms. In the 2010s, the music industry began moving into a more subscription-based music streaming model to help offset years of losses in revenue often attributed to the rise of illegal downloading in the 2000s. While this helped the music industry see increased revenue for six straight years moving into 2021, the video game industry has largely been slow to adapt to the medium when it comes to video game soundtracks. This is especially true of Japanese video game companies like Nintendo who has not only not adapted to the model, but actively targets users who upload unofficial soundtracks to sites such as YouTube. Below is a list of video game soundtracks released on major music streaming services, such as Apple Music or Spotify.

0-9
2010 FIFA World Cup South Africa
2014 FIFA World Cup Brazil

A
Abzû
Ace Attorney Investigations: Miles Edgeworth
Ace Attorney Investigations 2
Ace Combat 2/Assualt Horizon Legacy
Ace Combat 5: The Unsung War
Ace Combat 6: Fires of Liberation
Ace Combat Zero: The Belkan War
The Adventures of Bayou Billy (Apple Music in Japan only)
Age of Empires: Definitive Edition
Age of Empires II: Definitive Edition
AI: The Somnium Files
Alan Wake
Alex Kidd BMX Trial
Alex Kidd in Miracle World
Alex Kidd in Shinobi World
Alex Kidd in the Enchanted Castle
Alex Kidd: High-Tech World
Alex Kidd: The Lost Stars
Aliens: Fireteam Elite
Anno 1800
Anthem
Ape Escape
Apex Legends
Apollo Justice: Ace Attorney
Arc the Lad (Spotify only)
Arc the Lad II (Spotify only)
Ark: Survival Evolved
Art of Fighting
Art of Fighting 2
Art of Fighting 3: The Path of the Warrior
Ashes of the Singularity
Assassin's Creed II
Assassin's Creed III
Assassin's Creed III: Liberation
Assassin's Creed IV: Black Flag
Assassin's Creed: Brotherhood
Assassin's Creed Odyssey
Assassin's Creed Origins
Assassin's Creed: Revelations
Assassin's Creed Syndicate
Assassin's Creed Valhalla
Astro's Playroom
The Awesome Adventures of Captain Spirit
Axelay (Amazon Music in Japan only, Spotify link does not play)
Axiom Verge

B
Bastion
Batman: Arkham Knight
Batman: Arkham Origins
Battlefield 1 (2016)
Battlefield 4
Battlefield 2042
Battlefield Hardline
BattleTech
Battletoads (2020)
Bayonetta
Beat Saber
The Beginner's Guide
Beyond: Two Souls
BioShock 2
Black Mesa
BlazBlue: Calamity Trigger
BlazBlue: Central Fiction
BlazBlue: Chrono Phantasma
BlazBlue: Continuum Shift
Bloodborne
Borderlands
Borderlands 2
Borderlands 3
Borderlands: The Pre-Sequel
Botanicula
A Boy and His Blob
Braid
Bravely Default
Bravely Default II
Bravely Second: End Layer
Breath of Fire
Breath of Fire II
Breath of Fire III
Broken Age
Brütal Legend
Bubble Bobble 4 Friends
Bubble Bobble (Apple Music only)
Bubble Symphony (Apple Music only)
Burnout Paradise

C
Call of Duty: Black Ops
Call of Duty: Black Ops 4
Call of Duty: Black Ops Cold War
Call of Duty: Black Ops III
Call of Duty: Modern Warfare (2019)
Call of Duty: Modern Warfare 2 (2009)
Call of Duty: Modern Warfare 3
Call of Duty: WWII
Castlevania (1999)
Castlevania II: Belmont's Revenge (Apple Music in Japan only)
Castlevania II: Simon's Quest (Apple Music in Japan only)
Castlevania III: Dracula's Curse (Apple Music in Japan only)
Castlevania: Aria of Sorrow
Castlevania Chronicles
Castlevania: Circle of the Moon
Castlevania: Curse of Darkness
Castlevania: Dawn of Sorrow
Castlevania: The Dracula X Chronicles
Castlevania: Harmony of Despair
Castlevania: Harmony of Dissonance
Castlevania Judgment
Castlevania: Lament of Innocence
Castlevania: Order of Ecclesia
Castlevania: Portrait of Ruin
Castlevania: Symphony of the Night
Catherine/Catherine: Full Body
Celeste
Child of Light
Creaks
Chrono Cross
Chrono Trigger
Circuit Superstars
Coffee Talk
Contra (Apple Music in Japan only)
Contra 4 (Japan only)
Contra III: The Alien Wars (Apple Music in Japan only)
Contra: Hard Corps (Apple Music in Japan only)
Command & Conquer
Command & Conquer: Generals
Command & Conquer: Red Alert
Command & Conquer: Red Alert 2
Command & Conquer: Red Alert 3
Command & Conquer: Renegade
Command & Conquer: Tiberian Sun
Command & Conquer 3: Tiberium Wars
Concrete Genie
Control
Costume Quest
Crackdown 3
Crash Bandicoot N. Sane Trilogy
The Crew
Crisis Core: Final Fantasy VII
 Crusader Kings III
Crypt of the NecroDancer
Crysis 2
Cuphead
Cyberpunk 2077
Cyber Shadow

D
Danganronpa: Trigger Happy Havoc
Danganronpa 2: Goodbye Despair
Danganronpa Another Episode: Ultra Despair Girls
Danganronpa V3: Killing Harmony
Darius
Darius II
Dark Cloud (Spotify only)
The Dark Pictures Anthology: Little Hope
Dark Souls
Dark Souls II
Dark Souls III
Darkstalkers: The Night Warriors (Amazon Music only)
Dawn of Mana
Days Gone
Dead Space 2
Dead Space 3
Deathloop
Death Stranding
Demon's Souls (2020)
Desperados III
Destiny
Destiny 2
Detroit: Become Human
Deus Ex: Human Revolution
Deus Ex: Mankind Divided
Devil May Cry
Devil May Cry 2
Devil May Cry 3: Dante's Awakening
Devil May Cry 4
Devil May Cry 5
Diablo II
Dino Crisis
Dino Crisis 2
Dirt 5
Disaster Report 4 Plus: Summer Memories
Dishonored 2
Dissidia Final Fantasy/Dissidia 012 Final Fantasy
Dissidia Final Fantasy NT
DmC: Devil May Cry
Doom (2016)
Doom 64
Double Dragon
Double Dragon II: The Revenge
Double Dragon III: The Sacred Stones (NES version)
Double Dragon IV
Dragon Age II
Dragon Age: Inquisition
Dragon Age: Origins
Dreamfall: The Longest Journey
Driveclub
Dying Light
Dying Light 2 Stay Human
Dynasty Warriors (1997)
Dynasty Warriors 2
Dynasty Warriors 3
Dynasty Warriors 4
Dynasty Warriors 5
Dynasty Warriors 6
Dynasty Warriors 7
Dynasty Warriors 8
Dynasty Warriors 9

E
EA Sports UFC
EA Sports UFC 4
Earthworm Jim
Earthworm Jim 2
Einhänder
Elden Ring
The Elder Scrolls V: Skyrim
El Shaddai: Ascension of the Metatron
Elevator Action Returns
Ender Lilies: Quietus of the Knights
Enter the Gungeon
The Escapists 2
Etrian Mystery Dungeon
Etrian Odyssey
Etrian Odyssey II: Heroes of Lagaard
Etrian Odyssey III: The Drowned City
Etrian Odyssey IV: Legends of the Titan
Etrian Odyssey V: Beyond the Myth
Etrian Odyssey Nexus
Etrian Odyssey Untold: The Millennium Girl
Etrian Odyssey 2 Untold: The Fafnir Knight
Everybody's Gone to the Rapture
The Evil Within 2
E.X. Troopers

F
F1 22
Fall Guys
Fallout 3
Fallout 4
Fallout 76
Fallout: New Vegas
Far Cry 3: Blood Dragon
Far Cry 5
Far Cry 6
Far Cry New Dawn
Fantasy Zone
Fantasy Zone 2
Fatal Fury: King of Fighters
Fatal Fury 2/Special
Fatal Fury 3: Road to the Final Victory
Fez
FIFA 14
FIFA 15
FIFA 16
FIFA 20
FIFA 21
FIFA 22
Final Fantasy (NES and PS1 version)
Final Fantasy II (NES and PS1 version)
Final Fantasy III
Final Fantasy IV
Final Fantasy V
Final Fantasy VI
Final Fantasy VII
Final Fantasy VII Remake
Final Fantasy VIII
Final Fantasy IX
Final Fantasy X
Final Fantasy XI
Final Fantasy XII
Final Fantasy XIII
Final Fantasy XIII-2
Final Fantasy XIV and expansion packs
Final Fantasy XV
Final Fantasy Brave Exvius
Final Fantasy Crystal Chronicles
Final Fantasy Crystal Chronicles: The Crystal Bearers
Final Fantasy Fables: Chocobo's Dungeon (Amazon Music in Japan only)
The Final Fantasy Legend
Final Fantasy Legend II
Final Fantasy Legend III
Final Fantasy Tactics
Final Fantasy Type-0 HD
Florence
Flower
For Honor
Forza Horizon 4
Forza Horizon 5
FTL: Faster Than Light
Furi

G
G-Darius
Galactic Civilizations III
Gears 5/Hivebusters
Gears Tactics
Gears of War
Gears of War 2
Gears of War 3
Genshin Impact
Getsu Fūma Den (Amazon Music and Apple Music in Japan only)
Ghost of Tsushima
Ghosts 'n Goblins Resurrection
Ghostwire: Tokyo
Godfall
God of War (2018)
God of War Ragnarök
Golden Axe
Gone Home
Gotham Knights
Gran Turismo 7
Grand Theft Auto III
Grand Theft Auto IV and expansion packs
Grand Theft Auto V
Grand Theft Auto: Chinatown Wars
Grand Theft Auto: Liberty City Stories
Grand Theft Auto: San Andreas
Grand Theft Auto: Vice City
Grand Theft Auto: Vice City Stories
Gravity Rush (Amazon Music in Japan only)
Gravity Rush 2 (Japan only)
Gray Matter
The Great Ace Attorney: Adventures
The Great Ace Attorney 2: Resolve
Grim Fandango
Gris
Guacamelee! 2
Marvel's Guardians of the Galaxy (2021)
Guilty Gear
Guilty Gear 2: Overture
Guilty Gear Strive
Guilty Gear Xrd -SIGN-/REVELATOR/REV 2
Gun Frontier
The Gunk

H
Hades
Half-Life
Half-Life 2
Half-Life 2: Episode One
Half-Life 2: Episode Two
Half-Life: Alyx
Halo: Combat Evolved/CE Anniversary
Halo 2/2: Anniversary
Halo 3
Halo 3: ODST
Halo 4
Halo 5: Guardians
Halo Infinite
Halo: Reach
Halo Wars
Halo Wars 2
Hard Corps: Uprising (Amazon Music and Apple Music in Japan only)
A Hat in Time
Hearts of Iron IV
Hellgate: London
Heroes of the Storm
Hitman 2: Silent Assassin
Hogwarts Legacy
Hohokum
Hollow Knight
Horizon Forbidden West
Horizon Zero Dawn
Hotline Miami
Hylics 2
Hyper Light Drifter
Hyper Scape

I
I Am Setsuna
Ibb and Obb
Ico
Immortals Fenyx Rising
In Other Waters
Injustice 2
Injustice: Gods Among Us
Inscryption
Into the Breach

J
Jet Set Radio
Jet Set Radio Future
Journey (2012)
Judgment

K
Katana Zero
Kena: Bridge of Spirits
Kentucky Route Zero
Kid Dracula (1990) (Apple Music in Japan only)
KiKi KaiKai
Killer Instinct (1994)
Killer Instinct (2013)
Kingdom Hearts HD 1.5 ReMIX
Kingdom Hearts HD 2.5 ReMIX
Kingdom Hearts HD 2.8 Final Chapter Prologue
Kingdom Hearts III
Kingdom Hearts χ
The King of Fighters 2003
The King of Fighters XV
Kirby: Planet Robobot
Klonoa: Door to Phantomile
Klonoa 2: Lunatea's Veil
Klonoa Heroes: Densetsu no Star Medal

L
L.A. Noire
The Last Guardian
The Last of Us/Left Behind
The Last of Us Part II
Layton's Mystery Journey
League of Legends (Spotify only)
The Legend of Dragoon (Spotify only)
The Legend of Heroes: Trails from Zero
The Legend of Heroes: Trails in the Sky
The Legend of Heroes: Trails in the Sky SC
The Legend of Heroes: Trails in the Sky the 3rd
The Legend of Heroes: Trails into Reverie
The Legend of Heroes: Trails of Cold Steel
The Legend of Heroes: Trails of Cold Steel II
The Legend of Heroes: Trails of Cold Steel III
The Legend of Heroes: Trails of Cold Steel IV
The Legend of Heroes: Trails to Azure
Lego Universe
Legrand Legacy: Tale of the Fatebounds
Life Is Strange
Life Is Strange 2
Life Is Strange: Before the Storm
Life Is Strange: True Colors
Lightning Returns: Final Fantasy XIII
Like a Dragon: Ishin!
Limbo
Little Nightmares
Little Nightmares II
Little Orpheus
LocoRoco
Lost Judgment
Lost in Random
LSD: Dream Emulator

M
Machinarium
Madden NFL 16
Madden NFL 22
Mafia III
Magician Lord
Manifold Garden
Mario + Rabbids Kingdom Battle
Mario + Rabbids Sparks of Hope
Mass Effect
Mass Effect 2
Mass Effect 3
Max Payne 3
The Medium
Mega Man (NES and PS1 version)
Mega Man 2
Mega Man 3
Mega Man 4
Mega Man 5
Mega Man 6
Mega Man 11
Mega Man Battle Network
Mega Man Battle Network 2
Mega Man Battle Network 3
Mega Man Battle Network 4
Mega Man Battle Network 5
Mega Man Battle Network 6
Mega Man X
Mega Man X2
Mega Man X3
Mega Man X4
Mega Man X5
Mega Man X6
Mega Man X7
Mega Man X8
Mega Man Zero
Mega Man Zero 2
Mega Man Zero 3
Mega Man Zero 4
Mega Man ZX
Mega Man ZX Advent
Mercenary Kings
Metal Black
Metal Gear Rising: Revengeance
Metal Gear Solid 4: Guns of the Patriots
Metal Gear Solid V: Ground Zeroes
Metal Gear Solid V: The Phantom Pain
Metal Gear Survive
Metal Slug
Metal Slug 2/Metal Slug X
Metal Slug 3
Metal Slug 4
Metal Slug 5
Metal Slug 6
Metro Exodus
Minecraft
Minecraft Dungeons
Mirror's Edge
Mirror's Edge Catalyst
Monster Hunter 4
Monster Hunter Generations
Monster Hunter Rise
Monster Hunter Stories
Monster Hunter Tri
Monster Hunter: World/Iceborne
Monument Valley
Monument Valley 2
Mortal Kombat (1992)
Mortal Kombat II
Mortal Kombat 4
Mortal Kombat 11
Moss
The Mummy Demastered
Myst

N
NBA Street Vol. 2
Need for Speed (2015)
Need for Speed: Carbon
Need for Speed: Most Wanted (2005)
Need for Speed Payback
Need for Speed: ProStreet
Need for Speed: Underground 2
Nex Machina
NHL 21
NHL 22
Neo: The World Ends with You
Nidhogg 2
Nier
Nier: Automata
Night in the Woods
Nights into Dreams
Nights: Journey of Dreams
Nightshade (2003)
Ninja Senki DX
The Ninja Warriors (1987)
Nioh
Nioh 2
No Man's Sky
No More Heroes III
No Straight Roads

O
Octodad: Dadliest Catch
Octopath Traveler
Oddworld: Stranger's Wrath
Ōkami
Ōkamiden
Old Man's Journey
Old School RuneScape
Old World
OlliOlli2: Welcome to Olliwood
Operation C (Apple Music in Japan only)
The Order: 1886
Ori and the Blind Forest
Ori and the Will of the Wisps
Outer Wilds
Out Run
Out Run 2
Outrunners
Overcooked 2
Overwatch
Oxenfree

P
Pac-Man & Galaga Dimensions
Pac-Man Championship Edition DX
Pac-Mania
Panzer Dragoon
Panzer Dragoon II Zwei
Panzer Dragoon Orta
Panzer Dragoon Saga
Paradise Killer
Parasite Eve
Parasite Eve II
Payday 2
Pentiment
Persona 2: Eternal Punishment
Persona 2: Innocent Sin
Persona 3/3 FES/3 Portable
Persona 3: Dancing in Moonlight
Persona 4/4 Golden
Persona 4 Arena Ultimax
Persona 4: Dancing All Night
Persona 5/5 Royal
Persona 5: Dancing in Starlight
Persona 5 Strikers
Persona Q: Shadow of the Labyrinth
Persona Q2: New Cinema Labyrinth
Phoenix Wright: Ace Attorney
Phoenix Wright: Ace Attorney – Dual Destinies
Phoenix Wright: Ace Attorney – Justice for All
Phoenix Wright: Ace Attorney – Spirit of Justice
Phoenix Wright: Ace Attorney – Trials and Tribulations
Pikuniku
PixelJunk Eden
Plants vs. Zombies
Portal
Portal 2
Prey (2017)
Project Justice: Rival Schools 2
Protect Me Knight
Psychonauts
Psychonauts 2
Pu·Li·Ru·La

Q
Quantum Break

R
Rabbids Land
Ratchet & Clank: Rift Apart
Raving Rabbids: Alive & Kicking
RayForce
Rayman Legends
Red Dead Redemption/Undead Nightmare
Red Dead Redemption 2
Remember Me
Resident Evil (1996)
Resident Evil 2 (1998)
Resident Evil 2 (2019)
Resident Evil 3: Nemesis (1999)
Resident Evil 3 (2020)
Resident Evil 4 (2005)
Resident Evil 5 (Apple Music only)
Resident Evil 6
Resident Evil 7: Biohazard
Resident Evil: Revelations
Resident Evil: Revelations 2
Resident Evil Village
Resident Evil Zero
Returnal
Return of the Obra Dinn
The Revenge of Shinobi (1989)
Rez Infinite
Rhythm Thief & the Emperor's Treasure
Riders Republic
Rise of the Tomb Raider
Rival Schools: United by Fate
Rival Turf!
Riven
River City Girls
River City Girls Zero
River City Ransom 
Road 96
Robinson: The Journey
Robotics;Notes DaSH
Rocket League
Rockman EXE 4.5 Real Operation
Runner2
Ryū ga Gotoku Kenzan!

S
Sable
Sackboy: A Big Adventure
Sakura Wars (1996)
Sakura Wars (2019)
Sakura Wars 2: Thou Shalt Not Die
Sakura Wars 3: Is Paris Burning?
Sakura Wars 4: Fall in Love, Maidens
Sakura Wars: So Long, My Love
Samurai Shodown (1993)
Samurai Shodown (2019)
Samurai Shodown II
Samurai Shodown III
Samurai Shodown IV
Samurai Shodown V/V Special
Sayonara Wild Hearts
Scott Pilgrim vs. the World: The Game
Seasons After Fall
Secret of Mana
Serious Sam 3: BFE
Serious Sam 4
Serious Sam: Siberian Mayhem
Shadow the Hedgehog
Shantae and the Seven Sirens
Shatter
Shenmue
Shenmue II
Shenmue III
Shin Megami Tensei III: Nocturne (Amazon Music and Apple Music in Japan only)
Shin Megami Tensei V
Shin Megami Tensei: Liberation Dx2
Shibobi (2002)
A Short Hike
Shovel Knight
Silent Hill 2 (2001)
Silent Hill 3
Silent Hill 4: The Room
Silent Hill: Downpour
Silent Hill: Homecoming
Silent Hill: Origins
Silent Hill: Shattered Memories
The Simpsons: Hit & Run
The Sims and expansion packs
The Sims 2 and expansion packs
The Sims 3 and expansion packs
The Sims 4
SimCity 3000
SimCity 4
Skies of Arcadia
Sky: Children of the Light
Snatcher (Apple Music in Japan only)
Snowboard Kids
Snowboard Kids 2
Solar Ash
Soma
Sonic Adventure
Sonic Adventure 2
Sonic and the Black Knight
Sonic and the Secret Rings
Sonic CD (Japan/PAL region soundtrack, with one song from US region)
Sonic Colors/Colors: Ultimate
Sonic Forces
Sonic Frontiers
Sonic Generations
Sonic Heroes
Sonic the Hedgehog (1991)
Sonic the Hedgehog (2006)
Sonic the Hedgehog 2
Sonic Mania
Sonic R
Sonic Rush Adventure
Sonic Unleashed
Sorcerian
Soulcalibur VI
Space Channel 5
Space Harrier
Space Harrier 3-D
Space Harrier II
Spelunky
Marvel's Spider-Man (2018)
Marvel's Spider-Man: Miles Morales
SSX (2012)
Stardew Valley
Star Ocean/First Departure
Star Ocean: Anamnesis
Star Ocean: Integrity and Faithlessness
Star Ocean: The Last Hope
Star Ocean: The Second Story/Second Evolution
Star Ocean: Till the End of Time
Star Wars Battlefront (2015)
Star Wars Battlefront II (2017)
Star Wars Jedi: Fallen Order
Star Wars Knights of the Old Republic II: The Sith Lords
Star Wars: Squadrons
Star Wars: Tales from the Galaxy's Edge
State of Decay 2
Steel Assault
Stellaris
Street Fighter Alpha 3
Street Fighter III: 3rd Strike
Street Fighter IV/Super Street Fighter IV/Super Street Fighter IV: Arcade Edition/Ultra Street Fighter IV
Street Fighter V
Streets of Rage 2
Streets of Rage 4
Streets of SimCity
Subnautica: Below Zero
Suikoden (Amazon Music and Apple Music in Japan only)
Suikoden II (Amazon Music and Apple Music in Japan only)
Sunset Overdrive
Superbrothers: Sword & Sworcery EP
Super Contra (Apple Music in Japan only)
Super Meat Boy
Super Meat Boy Forever
Super Monkey Ball: Banana Blitz HD
Super Monkey Ball: Banana Mania
Super Street Fighter II Turbo
Syberia: The World Before
System Shock (1994)

T
Tales of the Abyss
Tales of Arise
Tales of Berseria
Tales of Destiny (both PS1 and PS2 versions, including the "Director's Cut")
Tales of Destiny 2
Tales of Eternia
Tales of Graces
Tales of Hearts
Tales of Luminaria
Tales of Phantasia (Super Famicom, PS1, and GBA versions)
Tales of Vesperia
Tales of Xillia
Tales of Xillia 2
Tales of Zestiria
The Talos Principle
Team Fortress 2
Team Sonic Racing
Tekken
Tekken 2
Tekken 3
Tekken 4
Tekken 5/Dark Resurrection
Tekken 6
Tekken 7
Tekken Tag Tournament
Tekken Tag Tournament 2
Tetris Effect
Thomas Was Alone
Thumper
Titanfall
Titanfall 2
Tokyo Xanadu
Tom Clancy's The Division 2
Tom Clancy's Ghost Recon Breakpoint
Tom Clancy's Ghost Recon Wildlands
Tom Clancy's Rainbow Six Extraction
Tom Clancy's Rainbow Six Siege
Tom Clancy's Splinter Cell: Chaos Theory
Tomb Raider (2013)
Tony Hawk's Pro Skater 1 + 2
To the Moon
Transistor
Trek to Yomi
Trials Fusion
Trials of Mana (1995)
Tunic
Turok: Dinosaur Hunter
Turok 2: Seeds of Evil
Twin Mirror

U
Uncharted 4: A Thief's End
Undertale
Unravel
Unravel Two
Ultimate Mortal Kombat 3

V
Valheim
Various Daylife
Virtua Fighter
Virtua Fighter 2
Virtua Fighter 3
Virtua Fighter 4
Virtua Fighter 5/Final Showdown/R

W
The Walking Dead
The Walking Dead: The Final Season
The Walking Dead: Michonne
The Walking Dead: A New Frontier
The Walking Dead: Season Two
Warhammer: End Times – Vermintide
Warhammer: Vermintide 2
Watch Dogs
Watch Dogs 2
Watch Dogs: Legion
West of Loathing
The Witcher
The Witcher 2: Assassins of Kings
The Witcher 3: Wild Hunt  and expansion packs
Wo Long: Fallen Dynasty
Wolfenstein II: The New Colossus
Wolfenstein: The New Order
The World Ends with You
World of Final Fantasy
World of Warcraft and expansion packs
Worms W.M.D

X
XIII (2020)
XCOM 2
XCOM: Chimera Squad

Y
Yakuza/Yakuza Kiwami
Yakuza 0
Yakuza 2
Yakuza 3
Yakuza 4
Yakuza 5
Yakuza 6: The Song of Life
Yakuza: Dead Souls
Yakuza: Like a Dragon
Yooka-Laylee
Ys I: Ancient Ys Vanished
Ys II: Ancient Ys Vanished – The Final Chapter
Ys III: Wanderers from Ys/Ys: The Oath in Felghana
Ys IV: The Dawn of Ys
Ys V: Lost Kefin, Kingdom of Sand
Ys VIII: Lacrimosa of Dana
Ys IX: Monstrum Nox
Ys: Memories of Celceta
Ys Origin
Ys Seven

Z

See also
List of video game soundtracks released on vinyl

Notes

References

video game
Music streaming platforms
Video game lists